The Aeolus AX3 is a subcompact crossover SUV produced by Dongfeng Motor Corporation under the Aeolus (Dongfeng Fengshen) sub-brand.

Overview 

The Aeolus AX3 was unveiled on the 2015 Shanghai Auto Show with the market launch in January 2016 revealing prices ranging from 69,700 yuan to 87,700 yuan.

Specifications
The Aeolus AX3 is powered by a 1.5 liter engine producing 116hp and 145nm mated to a five-speed manual gearbox or a four-speed automatic gearbox, and a 1.4 liter turbo engine producing 140hp and 196nm available with the five-speed manual gearbox. The same platform also underpins the Dongfeng Fengshen A30 subcompact sedan.

References

External links 

 Fengshen AX3 Official Website

2010s cars
Cars introduced in 2015
Cars of China
Crossover sport utility vehicles
Fengshen AX3
Front-wheel-drive vehicles
Mini sport utility vehicles